The Capes was a five-piece indie rock band from South London. Their hook-laden music drew comparisons to britpop, in particular Blur.

Biography
The band formed in 2002 when singer/guitarist Kris Barratt, keyboard player Richard Gladman, bass guitarist Rupert Cresswell and drummer Rupert Phelps began rehearsing together at South London's Goldsmiths College. Rupert Cresswell's brother Nick was soon brought in as an extra guitar and keyboard player, thus completing the current line-up of the band.

Hard Soul Records, an American label, released the band's debut EP Taste in 2005. This was followed in early 2006 by the Capes' first album, Hello. Despite two American tours, an appearance at SXSW, and favourable reviews by online publications such as Pitchfork Media and Cokemachineglow, by late 2006 the band had parted ways with Hard Soul. This was in part due to a general lack of support from the label, who, amongst other things, left the band stranded in Athens, Georgia at the end of the 2006 US tour. Hello, however, is still available both in the US and internationally via the iTunes Store.

In late 2006, the band signed to Fabtone records in Japan, who domestically released Hello, with a slightly different track list and some bonus tracks, on 10 January 2007.

The band has confirmed, via its Myspace page, that they are now defunct. Singer Kris Barratt is now focusing his attention on a new band, Spring Tigers, on the Bright Antenna label.

Discography

Albums
 Hello (Hard Soul Records, 2006)

Singles and EPs
 Taste EP (Hard Soul Records, 2005)
 "Tightly Wound" Single (Outafocus Records, 2005)

References

External links 
 Official site
 MySpace page
 [ Allmusic biography and reviews]
 Pitchfork review of Hello
 Cokemachineglow review of Hello

British indie rock groups
Musical groups established in 2002
Musical groups disestablished in 2008
2002 establishments in England